Thomas Boson (1635–1719) was a writer in the Cornish language and the cousin of Nicholas and John Boson. Thomas helped William Gwavas in his Cornish language research, and wrote an inscription in Cornish for Gwavas's hurling ball. He also made translations of the Ten Commandments, the Apostles' Creed, the Lord's Prayer and Hymn 166, and provided a genealogy of the Gwavas family. He is buried in Paul churchyard, where both Nicholas and John Boson are also buried.

References
 Matthew Spriggs, ‘Boson family (per. c.1675–1730)’, Oxford Dictionary of National Biography, Oxford University Press, 2004  accessed 11 Oct 2007

External links

 Site with Cornish language texts by Thomas Boson

1635 births
1719 deaths
Burials in Cornwall
People from Paul, Cornwall
Cornish-language writers